This is a list of airlines affiliated with Ukraine and registered by ICAO.

Scheduled airlines

Charter airlines

Cargo airlines

See also
List of defunct airlines of Ukraine
List of airports in Ukraine
List of airlines of Europe
List of defunct airlines of Europe

References

 01
Ukraine
Airline
Airline
A
Ukraine